The Revenge is a 1721 tragedy by the British writer Edward Young, set in 16th-century Spain. Although initially it did not enjoy the same success as his previous play Busiris, King of Egypt, it later became a much-revived work during the eighteenth century particularly popular because of the Othello-like role of the Moorish character Zanga. John Philip Kemble revived the work briefly in 1798 before Edmund Kean in 1815 did so with great success and it became part of his repertoire.

The original Drury Lane cast included Barton Booth as Don Alonzo, Robert Wilks as Don Carlos, John Thurmond as Don Alverez, John Mills as Zanga, Mary Porter as Leonora and Christiana Horton as Isabella. The work was dedicated to Young's patron the Duke of Wharton.

References

Bibliography
 Baines, Paul & Ferarro, Julian & Rogers, Pat. The Wiley-Blackwell Encyclopedia of Eighteenth-Century Writers and Writing, 1660-1789. Wiley-Blackwell, 2011.
 Burling, William J. A Checklist of New Plays and Entertainments on the London Stage, 1700-1737. Fairleigh Dickinson Univ Press, 1992.
 Kahan, Jeffrey. Shakespeare Imitations, Parodies and Forgeries, 1710-1820, Volume 1. Taylor & Francis, 2004.
 Nicoll, Allardyce. History of English Drama, 1660-1900, Volume 2. Cambridge University Press, 2009.
 Worrall, David. Harlequin Empire: Race, Ethnicity and the Drama of the Popular Enlightenment. Routledge, 2015.

1721 plays
British plays
West End plays
Tragedy plays
Plays set in Spain
Plays set in the 16th century